Grey (or de Grey) is a surname. It may refer to:

A 

 Agnes Grey, novel by Anne Brontë
 Al Grey (1925–2000), American jazz trombonist with Count Basie
 Alan Grey, a former New Zealand rower
 Albert Grey, 4th Earl Grey (1851–1917), British politician, Governor General of Canada, eponym of the Grey Cup
 Alex Grey (born 1953), American artist
 Allan Grey, a character from A Streetcar Named Desire
 Anchitell Grey (1624–1702), Parliamentary diarist and MP for Derby
 Arthur Grey, 14th Baron Grey de Wilton (1536–1593), British soldier, Lord Deputy of Ireland
 Aubrey de Grey (born 1963), English writer on gerontology

B 
 Beryl Grey (1927–2022), English ballerina
 Brad Grey (1957–2017), American television and film producer

C 
 CGP Grey, YouTuber
 Charles Grey, 1st Earl Grey (1729–1807), British General, C-in-C British troops in America
 Charles Grey, 2nd Earl Grey (1764–1845), British politician, Prime Minister and statesman, gave his name to a brand of aromatic tea
 Charles Grey, 5th Earl Grey (1879–1963)
 Christian Grey, principal character from the book Fifty Shades of Grey by E. L. James
 Cordelia Grey, fictional character

D 
 Daniel Grey (1848–1900), Welsh international footballer
 David Grey, American poker player
 Deborah Grey (born 1952), Canadian politician

E 
 Earl Grey: title in the British peerage
 Earl Grey tea: see also Charles Grey, 2nd Earl Grey
 Grey Cup: see also Albert Grey, 4th Earl Grey
 Edward Grey, 1st Viscount Grey of Fallodon (1862–1933), British statesman, later Ambassador to USA
 Edmund Grey, 1st Earl of Kent (1416–1490), administrator and magnate
 Elizabeth Grey, Viscountess Lisle (25 March 1505 – 1519), A suo jure English viscountess

F 
 Ford Grey, 1st Earl of Tankerville (1655–1701)

G 
 George Grey, Earl of Stamford and Warrington (1827–1883), President of MCC & landowner
 Sir George Grey (1812–1898), soldier, explorer, writer, Governor of: South Australia, New Zealand, Cape Colony (South Africa), New Zealand (2nd time)
 Sir George Grey (1799–1882), 2nd Baronet, British politician

H 
 Henry de Grey (died 1219), English magnate
 Henry Grey, 1st Duke of Suffolk (1517–1554), English magnate
 Henry Grey, 1st Baron Grey of Groby (1547–1614), British courtier and administrator, grandfather of Henry Grey, 1st Earl of Stamford
 Henry Grey, 10th Earl of Kent (1594–1651), British parliamentarian
 Henry Grey, 1st Earl of Stamford (1599–1673), British army officer, parliamentarian
 Henry Grey, 1st Duke of Kent (1671–1740), British courtier and politician
 Henry Grey, 3rd Earl Grey (1802–1894), British politician

J 

 Lady Jane Grey (1537–1554), married name Dudley, Nine Days Queen of England
 Janet Grey (born 1952), American actress
 J. D. Grey (1906–1985), American clergyman 
 Jean Grey, fictional character
 Jemima Yorke, 2nd Marchioness Grey (1723–1797), letter writer
 Jennifer Grey (born 1960), American actress
 Joel Grey (born 1932), American actor, singer and dancer
 Sir John Grey (1387–1459), English soldier of the Hundred Years' War, Lord Deputy of Ireland
 Sir John Grey (1780? – 19 February 1856), officer of British Army and the East India Company forces
 Johnny Grey (born 1951), American kitchen designer and architect
 Jonathan Grey (born 1992), Filipino basketball player
 Julius Grey (born 1948), Canadian lawyer, professor and minority rights advocate

K 
 Lady Katherine Grey (1540–1568), Countess of Hertford, younger sister of Lady Jane Grey, Queen of England
 Katherine Grey (actress) (1873–1950), American actress

L 
 Lady Grey (disambiguation), multiple people
 Lita Grey (1908–1995), American actress and wife of Charles Chaplin
 Lord Leonard Grey (1492–1551), 1st Viscount Grane, Lord Deputy of Ireland
 Dr. Lexie Grey, fictional character

M 
 Maria Georgina Grey (1816–1906), educationist and writer who promoted women's education
Martha Grey, Countess of Stamford (1838-1916), South African member of English nobility
 Mary Grey (disambiguation), multiple people
 Dr. Meredith Grey, fictional character
 Millward Grey full name Frederick Millward Grey (1899–1957) art teacher and designer in South Australia

N 

 Nigel de Grey (1886–1951), British codebreaker

P 
 Paris Grey (born 1965), American singer

R 
 Sir Raleigh Grey (1860–1936), pioneer British colonizer of Southern Rhodesia
 Ralph Grey, Baron Grey of Naunton (1910–1999), Governor of Northern Ireland
 Ray Grey (c. 1899 – 1925), American film director and actor
 Reginald Grey, 3rd Baron Grey de Ruthyn (1362–1440), marcher lord, governor of Ireland
 Richard de Grey (died 1271), governor of the Channel Islands and Warden of the Cinque Ports
 Roger Grey, 1st Baron Grey de Ruthyn (1298–1353), soldier
 Roger Grey, 10th Earl of Stamford (1896–1976), landowner
 Richard Grey (1458–1483), English soldier, constable of Wallingford Castle
 Richard Grey (1694–1771), English churchman and author
 Richard Grey, 6th Earl Grey (1939–2013), British nobleman
 Rudolph Grey, musician and writer

S 
 Sab Grey (born 1962), American musician
Sarah Grey (born 1996), Canadian actress
 Sasha Grey (born 1988), American sex idol
 Skylar Grey American Singer/Songwriter

T 
 Tanni Grey-Thompson (born 1969), Welsh athlete and TV presenter
 Sir Thomas Grey (1384–1415), of Heaton, conspirator
 Thomas Grey, 1st Marquess of Dorset (1457–1501), courtier
 Thomas Grey, Lord Grey of Groby (c. 1623 – 1657), Member of Parliament during the English Long Parliament
 Thomas Grey, 2nd Earl of Stamford (c. 1654 – 1720), son of Thomas, Lord Grey of Groby
 Thomas de Grey, 2nd Earl de Grey (1781–1859), born Robinson, British Tory politician and statesman of the 19th century
 Thomas de Grey, 6th Baron Walsingham, British politician and entomologist

V 
 Virginia Grey (1917–2004), American actress
 Vivian Grey (1827), title of Benjamin Disraeli's first novel

Z 
 Zane Grey (1872–1939), American novelist

See also 
 Grey (disambiguation)
 Baron Grey (disambiguation)
 Gray (surname)

References

Surnames from nicknames